Sophie von Adelung (11 March 1850 – 15 June 1927) was a German writer and painter. She also wrote under the pseudonym S. Aden.

Sophie von Adelung was born in Stuttgart, into a family of Russian origin; her father, Nikolaus von Adelung (1809–1878), was secretary to Queen Olga, and was a privy councillor in the Kingdom of Württemberg. In addition to his other work, Nikolaus was literary executor of his father, Friedrich von Adelung. Sophie's mother, Alexandrine von Schubert (1824–1901), was the daughter of General Friedrich von Schubert. Other children of the marriage between Alexandrine and Nikolaus included a son, named after his father, who became a noted entomologist, and another daughter, Olga, with whom Sophie collaborated on several works.

Her books, which she often illustrated herself, were mainly directed at young people. She also translated stories into German from Russian. She wrote regularly for magazines such as Die Frau (Woman) and Fürs Haus (For the House). Some of her work appeared in Thekla von Gumpert's Töchter-Album (Daughter's Album).

Her circle included the pianist Maria von Harder, a former pupil of Chopin, whose memories of the composer were recorded by von Adelung, and her own cousin, Sofia Kovalevskaya, who visited her Adelung relatives as a young woman. Sophie von Adelung produced a memoir of her cousin in 1896, after Kovalevskaya's death.

Works

Novels and plays
 Zwei Mädchenbilder in Pastell. Erzählungen für junge Mädchen (1888)
 Russlana. Erzählung für junge Mädchen (1888)
 Kleeblatt. Drei Erzählungen für junge Mädchen (1889)
 Jugenderinnerungen an Sophie Kowalewsky (1896)
 Jugendbühne. Ernste und heitere Theaterstücke für die Jugend herausgegeben von Sophie von Adelung (5 volumes)
 Band 1: Heinrich von Eichenfels, Die Schneckenvroni, Der Grösste
 Band 2: Der Lumpensammler, Die Maikönigin
 Band 3: Rosa von Tannenburg. Das Blumenkörbchen. Das Johanniskäferchen. (58)
 Band 5: Der verzauberte Königssohn (nach einem Märchen von M. Chovanetz; 1897)
 Das graue Fräulein auf Scharfenstein. Hessische Volkssage (1897)
 Sonntagsfriede am Werktag (1920)
 Chopin als Lehrer (1923)
 Täubchen (1924)
 Hamsmelis Mäxle (1830)
 Der grössere Held und Das Professorle

References

External links

1850 births
1927 deaths
German women writers
German women painters
German children's writers
Writers from Stuttgart
Translators from Russian
Translators to German
German translators